Mis Ojos Tristes (English: My Sad Eyes) is the eleventh studio album by Mexican singer-songwriter Juan Gabriel, originally released in 1978 and re-released in May 1996. Mariachi América de Jesus Rodríguez de Hijar was involved with this production.

Track listing

References

External links
Juan Gabriel official myspace site
Mis Ojos Tristes on Amazon.com
[ Mis Ojos Tristes on AllMusic]

1978 albums
Juan Gabriel albums
RCA Records albums
Spanish-language albums